Atalopedes mesogramma is a butterfly in the family Hesperiidae. It is found on the Greater Antilles and Cuba.

Subspecies
Atalopedes mesogramma mesogramma (Cuba)
Atalopedes mesogramma apa Comstock, 1944 (Puerto Rico)

References

Butterflies described in 1824
Hesperiini